Stas Aleksandrovich Pokatilov (born 8 December 1992) is a Kazakh footballer who plays for Aktobe.

Career
On 30 December 2014, Pokatilov signed a two-year contract with FC Aktobe. On 26 February 2016, FC Rostov announced they had signed Pokatilov. On 4 July 2016, Pokatilov signed for FC Kairat on loan until the end of the 2016 season. At the end of the season 2016, Pokatilov moved to Kairat on a permanent deal from Rostov, signing a three-year contract on 13 December 2016.

On 25 November 2019, Pokatilov signed a new three-year contract with FC Kairat. On 19 January 2022, Kairat announced that Pokatilov had left the club.

On 1 February 2022, Pokatilov re-signed for Aktobe.

Career statistics

Club

International

Personal life
He has a twin-brother Vladimir Pokatilov, who is also football player.

References

External links
 FC Akzhayik profile 
 

Living people
1992 births
Kazakhstani people of Russian descent
People from Oral, Kazakhstan
Kazakhstani footballers
Kazakhstan international footballers
Association football goalkeepers
Kazakhstan Premier League players
FC Akzhayik players
FC Shakhter Karagandy players
FC Aktobe players
FC Rostov players